Jorunn Kirkenær (4 May 1926 – 22 January 2021) was a Norwegian ballet dancer and choreographer.

Career
She was born in Oslo, and married dancer and actor Even Kirkenær in 1948. She studied classical ballet with Rita Tori from 1945, and graduated as pedagogist in dance and choreography in 1947. She has been assigned with various stages, including Malmö City Theatre, Nationaltheatret, Det Norske Teatret and Den Norske Ballett. Her works as choreographer include Reisen til Julestjernen (for the National Theatre), and ballet versions of the children's operas Little Red Riding Hood and Ma mère l'Oye for television with the Norwegian Broadcasting Corporation. In 1966 she founded the dance training school Ballettinstituttet. She was awarded the King's Medal of Merit in gold in 1996.

References

1926 births
2021 deaths
Entertainers from Oslo
Norwegian ballerinas
Norwegian choreographers
Recipients of the King's Medal of Merit in gold